Spring New Year festival may refer to the following:
Nowruz, Iranian New Year
Chinese New Year